The Baroque guitar (c. 1600–1750) is a string instrument with five courses of gut strings and moveable gut frets. The first (highest pitched) course sometimes used only a single string.

History
The Baroque guitar replaced the Renaissance lute as the most common instrument found when one was at home. The earliest attestation of a five-stringed guitar comes from the mid-sixteenth-century Spanish book Declaracion de Instrumentos Musicales by Juan Bermudo, published in 1555. The first treatise published for the Baroque guitar was Guitarra Española de cinco ordenes (The Five-course Spanish Guitar), c. 1590, by Juan Carlos Amat.

The baroque guitar in contemporary ensembles took on the role of a basso continuo instrument and players would be expected to improvise a chordal accompaniment. Several scholars have assumed that the guitar was used together with another basso continuo instrument playing the bass line. However, there are good reasons to suppose that the guitar was used as an independent instrument for accompaniment in many situations. Intimately tied to the development of the Baroque guitar is the alfabeto system of notation.

Tuning 
Three different ways of tuning the guitar are well documented in seventeenth-century sources as set out in the following table.  This includes the names of composers who are associated with each method. Very few sources seem to clearly indicate that one method of stringing rather than another should be used and it is often argued that it may have been up to the player to decide what was appropriate. The issue is highly contentious and different theories have been put forward.

A very brief list of composers and tunings:

Composers 
Giovanni Paolo Foscarini (c.1600 -  1650), I quattro libri della chitarra spagnola (c.1635) 
Francesco Corbetta (1615–1681), Varii scherzi di sonate, Libro 4 (c.1648) 
Angelo Michele Bartolotti (c.1615-1680)
Giovanni Battista Granata (1620 - 1687)
Gaspar Sanz (c.1640–1710), Instrucción de música sobre la guitarra española (1674) 
Robert de Visée (c.1658 – 1725), Livre de guittarre dédié au roy (1682) , Livre de pièces pour la guitare (c.1686) 
Ludovico Roncalli (1654 - 1713), Capricci armonici sopra la chitarra spagnola (1692) 
Francisco Guerau (1649 - 1722), Poema harmonico (1694) 
 Henri Grenerin (fl. mid-17th century)
Santiago de Murcia (c. 1673 - 1739), Resumen de acompañar la parte con la guitarra (1714) , Cifras selectas de guitarra (1722) , Códice Saldívar No.4 (c.1730) , and Passacalles y Obras (1732)

Sample of makers 
Matteo Sellas (1600s).

Antonio Stradivari (1644–1737). Of his five surviving guitars, the 1679 "Sabionari" is the only one in playable condition.
It is the solo instrument on more than a dozen videos at YouTube.com.
Two other Stradivari guitars are in museums.
An instrument of 1688
is in the Ashmolean Museum in Oxford, England, and
an instrument of 1700 is in the National Music Museum in Vermillion, South Dakota.

Nicholas Alexandre Voboam II (c. 1634/46–1692/1704). French luthier with three guitars bearing his signature (from a total of 26 attributed to the Voboam Family). The guitars of Alexandre were held in high esteem during his lifetime and a century later were still considered desirable instruments.

Performers

 David Ryckaert III (Antwerp 1612–1661)
 Lex Eisenhardt
 Eduardo Egüez
 Paul O'Dette
 Hopkinson Smith
 Stephen Stubbs
 Xavier Díaz-Latorre
 Rolf Lislevand
 Nigel North
 Jakob Lindberg
 Barry Mason
 Ugo Nastrucci
 Andrea Damiani
 Massimo Lonardi
 James Tyler
 Patrick O'Brien

Gallery

Bibliography 
Lex Eisenhardt, Italian Guitar Music of the Seventeenth Century, University of Rochester Press, 2015.
Lex Eisenhardt, "Bourdons as Usual". In The Lute: The Journal of the Lute Society, vol. XLVII (2007)
Lex Eisenhardt, "Baroque guitar accompaniment: where is the bass". In Early Music, vol. 42, No 1 (2014)
Lex Eisenhardt, "A String of Confusion"
James Tyler, "The Early Guitar", Oxford University Press, 1980.
James Tyler/Paul Sparks, The Guitar and its Music", Oxford University Press, 2002.
James Tyler, " A guide to playing the Baroque Guitar" Indiana University Press, 2011.
Monica Hall: Baroque Guitar Stringing : a survey of the evidence (Guildford: The Lute Society, 2010)  
Monica Hall: "Recovering a lost book of guitar music by Corbetta". In Consort: The Journal of the Dolmetsch Foundation, Vol. 61 (2005). 
Monica Hall: "The "Guitarra espanola" of Joan Carles Amat". In Early Music, Vol. 6, no. 3, July 1978.
Monica Hall: "Dissonance in the guitar music of Francesco Corbetta". In Lute: The Journal of the Lute Society, Vol. XLVII (2007)
Monica Hall: "Angiol Bartolotti's Lettere tagliate". In Lute: The Journal of the Lute Society, Vol. XLVII  (2007)
Monica Hall: "Tuning instructions for the baroque guitar in Bibliotheque Nationale Res. Vmc Ms. 59, f. 108v". In Lute: The Journal of the Lute Society, Vol. XLVII (2007)
Antoni Pizà: Francesc Guerau i el seu temps (Palma de Mallorca: Govern de les Illes Balears, Conselleria d'Educació i Cultura, Direcció General de Cultura, Institut d'Estudis Baleàrics, 2000). 
Hélène Charnassé, Rafael Andia, Gérard Rebours, The Guitar Books of Robert de Visée, Paris: Editions Musicales Transatlantiques,2000, 235 pages.
Thomas Schmitt: "Sobre la ornamentación en el repertorio para guitarra barroca en España (1600-1750)". In: Revista de Musicología, XV, nº 1, 1992
Giovanni Accornero, Eraldo Guerci (edited and translated by Davide Rebuffa) - The Guitar: "Four Centuries of Masterpieces", (Italian/English), Edizioni Il Salabue, 2008.  
Carlo Alberto Carutti, "Passioni di un collezionista", Catalogue by Giovanni Accornero (edited and translated by Davide Rebuffa), (Italian/English), Edizioni Il Salabue, 2011.  (also available on CD rom)

References

External links

 Technique "Baroque guitar for the modern performer - a practical compromise", by Don Rowe and Richard d’A Jensen

Baroque instruments
Non-Spanish classical guitars
Acoustic guitars